Jammes is a surname. Notable people with the surname include:

Francis Jammes (1868–1938), French poet
Jean-Vital Jammes (1825–1893), French opera singer
Robert Jammes (1927–2020), French linguist

See also
Saint-Jammes, a commune of Pyrénées-Atlantiques, France
James (disambiguation)